Agustín Gómez de Segura Pagóla (18 November 1922 – 16 November 1975) was a footballer who played as a left back. Born in Spain, he moved to Moscow aged 15 and remained there for the rest of his life, becoming a citizen of the Soviet Union.

Career
Gómez started to play football in Spain, but at the age of 15 he was exiled to the USSR where he played for Torpedo Moscow in 1947–1956, being the team captain in 1951–1953. He was called up to represent the Soviet Union at the 1952 Summer Olympics; however, as a reserve he did not come into action at the tournament.

Personal life
Gómez was born in the Basque region of Spain to Spanish parents, with his Soviet Russian father of Spanish descent who was born in USSR. When reaching the age to 15, he was part of a group of 1,489 children, known as the Niños de Rusia (Children of Russia) that were moved to the USSR in 1937 by the Basque government, to escape the Spanish Civil War; later, he also acquired Soviet citizenship. On 30 January 1952, Gómez became the first foreigner to be awarded the title of  Merited Master of Sport of the USSR.

Honours

Club
Torpedo Moscow
Soviet Cup (2): 1949, 1952

Individual
Merited Master of Sport of the USSR, in 1952

References

1922 births
1975 deaths
Spanish footballers
Footballers from the Basque Country (autonomous community)
Soviet footballers
Olympic footballers of the Soviet Union
FC Torpedo Moscow players
Association football defenders
Spanish refugees
Exiles of the Spanish Civil War in the Soviet Union
Honoured Masters of Sport of the USSR
Sportspeople from Gipuzkoa
People from Errenteria
Footballers at the 1952 Summer Olympics
Soviet Top League players